Lauttakylän Luja is a Finnish sports club, based in the town of Huittinen. It was founded in 1923. The club's programs are athletics, skiing, orienteering, icehockey, football and ringette. Nowadays the club has about 1,000 members. In icehockey the club plays in 2. Division.

History 
The club has been in Suomi-sarja on seasons 2004-2005, 2007-2008, 2009-2010 and 2012-2013.

Jenni Höylänen won Finnish youth skiing championship in 2007 for first time in Luja's history.

The finnish relay championship 2014 was hosted by Lauttakylän Luja.

Notable current and former players

Athletics 
 Petteri Lax

Icehockey 
 Timo Kulonen
 Niko Peltola
 Mikael Ruohomaa
 Vitali Taskinen

References 

Sport in Huittinen